Françoise Descamps-Crosnier (born October 13, 1955 in Mantes-la-Jolie, Yvelines) is a French politician who was member of the National Assembly of France as member of the Socialist Party.

References

1955 births
Living people
People from Mantes-la-Jolie
Socialist Party (France) politicians
Women members of the National Assembly (France)
Deputies of the 14th National Assembly of the French Fifth Republic
21st-century French women politicians